Papa Ajasco and Company (formerly The Ajasco Family) is a Nigerian family television sitcom created by Wale Adenuga in 1996. The show is a spin-off of a feature film of the same title produced by Wale Adenuga in 1984, which in turn is based on the comic Ikebe Super. The story revolves around the Ajasco family and their comedic interpretations to major societal issues. The main characters include womanising patriarch Papa Ajasco, his long-suffering wife Mama Ajasco, their mischievous son Bobo Ajasco, local playboy Boy Alinco, promiscuous gold-digger Miss Pepeiye, and illiterate ne'er-do-wells Pa James and Pa Jimoh. At its prime, Papa Ajasco was widely considered to be Nigeria's most watched comedy series, viewed weekly in twelve African countries.

Background 
Adenuga released Papa Ajasco movie in 1983, which was one of Golden Age Nollywood productions. He stated in an interview that the title character was motivated from the lead role in Ikebe Super. Adenuga began producing and airing the television series as Ajasco Family in 1996.

Character descriptions 
Papa Ajasco: A womanising bald-headed husband, who often hits his head when astonished at an event.
Mama Ajasco: The wife of Papa Ajasco
Pa James: An elderly man, who usually expresses himself in unintelligent ways.
Boy Alinco: A narcissistic young man, who has a signature mode of walking.
Miss Pepeiye: A materialistic young lady
Bobo Ajasco: Son of Papa and Mams Ajasco

Reception 
Papa Ajasco television series is widely watched across families in Nigeria. In 2010, it debuted in Ghana through Ghana Television and was reputed to being the "best comedy on television" in the country. It also won Kwame Nkrumah Leadership Award in Accra. A survey conducted by Pulse Nigeria revealed that "Papa Ajasco" character was the most loved with 29.2% of the votes, closely followed by "Boy Alinco" and "Pa James". Papa Ajasco is watched weekly across twenty terrestrial stations in Nigeria and in eleven African countries including Kenya, Tanzania, Uganda and Guinea. In 2013, several additions were made to the cast of new episodes including Femi Brainard, Niyi Johnson and Henrietta Kosoko

References 

1996 Nigerian television series debuts
Nigerian comedy television series
2000s Nigerian television series
2010s Nigerian television series
Television shows set in Nigeria
1990s Nigerian television series
Black sitcoms
Nigerian comedy-drama films
Nigerian Television Authority original programming
Africa Independent Television original programming